is a third-person shooter video game franchise created by Hisashi Nogami, and developed and owned by Nintendo. Set in a post-apocalyptic Earth inhabited by anthropomorphic marine animals, the series centers around fictional cephalopods known as Inklings and Octolings – based on squids and octopuses respectively – which can transform between humanoid and cephalopod forms at will. They frequently engage in turf war battles with each other and use a variety of weapons that produce and shoot colored ink while in humanoid form, or swim and hide in surfaces covered in their own-colored ink while in their cephalopodic forms.

The first game in the series, Splatoon, was released for the Wii U on May 28, 2015. A sequel, Splatoon 2, was released for the Nintendo Switch on July 21, 2017, followed by an expansion pack, Octo Expansion, on June 13, 2018. The series has received positive reviews for its style, gameplay mechanics and soundtrack, with the first two games in the series having been nominated and awarded several year-end accolades from various gaming publications. The series has sold over 26 million copies. A third game, Splatoon 3, was released on 9 September 2022.

Splatoon has spawned numerous collaborations with third-party companies and established its own esports tournament circuit in 2018. It has spawned a manga series as well as holographic music concerts in Japan.

Gameplay

Splatfests 
"Splatfests" are special, recurring in-game festival events that take place in the games, where players are asked a question and pick a team based on the answer that they chose. For example, players could be asked to pick between mayonnaise or ketchup, or if they prefer using a fork or a spoon. Similarly to the first game, Splatoon 2 features Splatfest events that include crossovers with other brands, both from other Nintendo properties such as Super Smash Bros. Ultimate and Super Mario, and third-party franchises including Teenage Mutant Ninja Turtles, McDonald's, Uniqlo, Nike, Sanrio, Meiji, Pocky, and NPB. For Splatoon 3, there are three sides to choose from and just like in the first two games, crossover Splatfest events will be included with other Nintendo franchises such as Pokémon and third-party franchises.

Players then play a series of turf war matches and contribute scores to the side they picked. A scoring system decides the winning side based on the overall score of those who played. Although all Splatfests in Splatoon 2 ended in July 2019, themes have been repeated since then, and a Splatfest with a unique theme, "Super Mushroom vs. Super Star", happened from 15 to 17 January 2021 in celebration of the Super Mario 35th Anniversary.

Due to the  polarizing nature of the choices offered during Splatfests, the themes themselves tend to be the subject of media attention. The themes range from preference questionnaires (e.g. cats vs. dogs, arts vs. sciences), to paradoxes (e.g. chicken or the egg), or sometimes be part of a real-life corporate partnership or sponsorship with Nintendo (such as a Transformers-themed Splatfest with Hasbro, the Teenage Mutant Ninja Turtles and SpongeBob SquarePants-themed ones with Nickelodeon, or one with McDonald's).

In most Splatfests, the outcome tends to only affect the player's level of in-game reward at the end of the event and typically have no impact on the overall playability of the game. However, the exception to this is the last Splatfest of each game, which has marked the end of developer support for the game. It was revealed that the outcome of the last Splatfest in Splatoon affected the story mode of Splatoon 2, in which the losing protagonist Callie became an antagonist. This was later confirmed by a developer after Splatoon 3's theme and setting seemed to be based on the winner of Splatoon 2's final Splatfest, "Chaos vs. Order".

Esports 
Due to the availability of competitive game modes in Splatoon, competitive esports tournaments with sponsored prizing have been held as early as 2016 in Japan.

With the release of Splatoon 2, Nintendo established the Splatoon 2 World Championships and began hosting competitive tournaments in 2018. Teams of four compete in a series of online qualifiers or live tournaments to earn invitations to play at the World Championships, which are played at the Nintendo World Championships alongside other Nintendo games such as Super Smash Bros. Ultimate. The event is typically held during Nintendo's E3 events and livestreamed.

Development

Splatoon was developed for the Wii U by Nintendo Entertainment Analysis & Development. It originally consisted of a four-versus-four ink-based territory control game set in a featureless arena. The game was subsequently developed to incorporate squid-like creatures, now called Inklings, which could switch between humanoid and squid forms in order to be able to hold weapons as a humanoid, while being able to hide or swim through ink as a squid. In 2014, Splatoon was revealed during a Nintendo Direct video presentation at E3 2014, and a playable demo version was made available on the show floor. Subsequently, a time-limited multiplayer demo, the "Global Testfire", was made available on 8, 9 and 23 May 2015. The game was seen as a surprising reveal as Nintendo unveiled a new IP during the underperformance of the Wii U. The full game was released globally between 28 and 30 May 2015 and included a single-player story campaign mode as well as several online multiplayer modes.

Splatoon 2 was developed by Nintendo Entertainment Planning & Development for the Nintendo Switch and was announced in January 2017. It takes place approximately two years after the events of the final Splatfest in the first game, an in-game festival event where players voted for one of the two protagonists, the Squid Sisters, and fought it out by playing a series of turf war matches. It was later revealed that the results of the Splatfest directly influenced the story of Splatoon 2. Splatoon 2 features a redesigned user interface due to the lack of the Wii U GamePad's touch screen, and includes new maps, weapons and abilities. A new player versus environment mode known as "Salmon Run" was introduced along with a new competitive multiplayer mode called "Clam Blitz" added in December 2017. In March 2017, a "Splatoon 2 Global Testfire" event was made available. A second demo which featured the in-game festival Splatfest was released on 15 July 2017. The full game was subsequently released on 21 July 2017. SplatNet 2, a service contained within the Nintendo Switch Online mobile app was released which allows players to view their in-game statistics, earn digital wallpapers by completing challenges, and communicate with other players through voice chat. During a Nintendo Direct in March 2018, Nintendo announced Splatoon 2: Octo Expansion, a paid downloadable content (DLC) expansion, which features a new single-player campaign and a new playable race of cephalopod known as Octolings. The DLC was made available globally on 13 June 2018. On 22 April 2022, the same day as the Splatoon 3 release date trailer, the DLC was added as a benefit to members of the Switch Online Expansion Pass.

Splatoon 3 was announced in a Nintendo Direct on 17 February 2021, now with three featured idols. It was released on 9 September 2022, as confirmed by a trailer on 22 April 2022 and was being developed by Nintendo Entertainment Planning & Development. Splatoon 3 takes place about five years after Splatoon 2 ended, and, using the corrupt CEO of Grizzco, the Splatoon 3 story mode differs from any of the other games in the series. The game features new maps, weapons, abilities, and movement options, along with a new singleplayer mode based on card games, known as "Tableturf Battle". An early-access demo titled "Splatoon 3: Splatfest World Premiere" was held on 27 August 2022 with a rock-paper-scissors Splatfest theme. In addition, the Nintendo Switch Online app includes SplatNet 3 with in-game stats, voice chat, and many more.

Reception 

Games in the Splatoon series have been generally well-received, and its unique gameplay has been credited as a successful reinvention of the third-person shooter genre. The first two games in the series have been nominated and won numerous awards from various gaming publications and organizations.

Splatoon won Best Shooter and Best Multiplayer at The Game Awards 2015, and was nominated for awards in Game Innovation, Multiplayer and Original Property at the 12th British Academy Games Awards. It received the award for Best Family Game and Best Nintendo Game at the 33rd Golden Joystick Awards The Japan Game Awards labeled it as Game of the Year for 2015 as did the British Academy Children's Awards.

Splatoon 2 was nominated for Best Family Game and Best Multiplayer at The Game Awards 2017, as well as an award in Multiplayer at the 14th British Academy Games Awards. It was nominated for Best Multiplayer Game and Nintendo Game of the Year at the 35th Golden Joystick Awards. The game received an Excellence Reward for Game Design at CEDEC 2018.

Splatoon 3 won Best Multiplayer Game at The Game Awards 2022, along with a nomination for Best Family Game. It also received a nomination for the Central Park Children's Zoo Award for Best Kids Game at the New York Game Awards.

Legacy
Characters from Splatoon such as the Inklings have appeared in other Nintendo games, such as Super Mario Maker on the Wii U and Mario Kart 8 Deluxe and Super Smash Bros. Ultimate on the Nintendo Switch. Super Smash Bros. Ultimate additionally features a playable stage, Moray Towers, 26 music tracks, and an Assist Trophy based on the Squid Sisters. A crossover event between Splatoon 2 and Animal Crossing: Pocket Camp occurred in September 2018. In July 2019, a Splatoon 2 theme was made available in Tetris 99 to commemorate Splatoon 2s "Final Fest" Splatfest on 18 July 2019.

The NES Zapper, which appears in all three games as a usable weapon, has become a popular collectible item following its inclusion.

Water guns modeled after the weapons that appear in the games have been sold as toys.

NPR reported on how Splatoon was different from most other shooters in the genre and has created a more welcoming community than other shooters.

In other media

Print media 
Between January 2016 and March 2017, two webcomic series based on Splatoon appeared in Enterbrain's Weekly Famitsu magazine: Honobono Ika 4koma illustrated by Kino Takahashi, and Play Manga by various doujin writers. The comics were published by Kadokawa Future Publishing on 15 June 2017.

A Splatoon manga series illustrated by Sankichi Hinodeya began serialization in Shogakukan's CoroCoro Comic magazine in February 2016, following a one-shot published in CoroCoro in May 2015. The licensing rights to publish the manga in North America was later acquired by Viz Media in 2017. In July 2017, a motion comic adaptation of the manga was announced and then released on CoroCoro YouTube channel the following month. As of February 2018, the manga has over 800,000 copies in print and the series is currently ongoing.

In April 2017, a manga series illustrated by  titled Splatoon: Squid Kids Comedy Show was published in Bessatsu CoroCoro Comic. It was also later acquired by Viz Media, who translated and published the series in North America.

Music 
In the universe of Splatoon, the game's protagonists, the Squid Sisters, Off The Hook, and Deep Cut, are fictional popstars which create and perform the music as heard within the games. As a result, a series of real-life virtual concerts featuring holograms of the game's protagonists have been held at various locations.

In 2016, a concert tour known as "Squid Sisters Live" was held commemorating the sale of 1 million copies of Splatoon. The concerts have taken place at Niconico Tokaigi, Chokaigi and Niconico Cho Party in Japan, and the Japan Expo in Paris. Similarly, concert tours featuring Splatoon 2s Off the Hook was held months after the game's release since 2018. Recordings from the concerts have been made into albums.

An official soundtrack, Splatune, was released by Enterbrain in Japan on 21 October 2015. The soundtrack to the sequel, Splatune 2, and another for the Octo Expansion, Octotune, released on 29 November 2017 and 18 July 2018 respectively. Deep Cut, introduced in Splatoon 3, performed live for the first time in Japan on 9 October 2022.

Notes

References

External links 

 
Cephalopods in popular culture
Marine life in popular culture
Nintendo franchises
Third-person shooters
Video games about shapeshifting
Video games adapted into comics
Video game franchises
Video game franchises introduced in 2015
Post-apocalyptic video games
Third-person shooters by series